Ester Plicková (2 July 1928 – 1 December 2011) was a Slovak ethnographer and photographer with a specialty in folk pottery. Working as an ethnographer, lecturer and professional photographer, Plicková documented and researched folk culture and crafts. She received the Gold Medal of Ľudovíta Štúra in 1988 for her work to preserve and conserve Slovak folk culture.

Early life
Ester Plicková was born on 2 July 1928 in Bratislava, Czechoslovakia to the historian, Vladimír Plicka. From childhood, Plicková and her sister were active in sports and involved in cultural activities. In addition to being an expert of Bratislava's history, her father wrote children's stories and her uncle, Karel Plicka was a noted photographer. As a child, Plicková often accompanied her uncle on photographic expeditions to unusual places and served him by carrying his equipment and observing his work. Simultaneously, she completed a two-year course at the School of Photography Arts in Bratislava and spent a year studying in Prague, taking courses on art history and ethnography, before graduating in 1952.

Career
In 1952, Plicková was hired as the first ethnographer at the Slovak National Museum and left there in  1955, when she began working at the Institute of Ethnology. In 1961, she defended her thesis for her PhD with a study of Slavic Pottery. Early in her career she recognized that social change was replacing traditional culture and photography was a means to preserve artistic expression, rites, rituals, and traditions. Criss-crossing the country, she took photographs of folk festivals and craft shows, architectural monuments, industrial works, and nature. Some of the images she made in the early part of her career depict items which are no longer extant, such as the bombed Apollo refinery, a mining shaft in Kremnica, or the ruins of the Bratislava Castle, before its restoration.

As part of her duties at the Institute of Ethnology, Plicková organized numerous conferences and exhibitions in addition to her lectures. In 1978, she worked on an exhibition in Faenza, Italy featuring Slovak ceramics. Plicková also processed multiple collections, such as   Štefan Cyril Parrák's Trnava ceramics grouping. Linking her ethnographic work to her photography, Plicková worked as a professional photographer and exhibited her photographs in numerous domestic and international venues, such as one held in Baghdad in 1967.

Between 1961 and 1986 Plicková was a member of the international council of the European magazine, Demos, which was published in Germany until 2002. She published numerous scientific studies and photographic collections. Also well known are her pictorial collections published in the book Banská Štiavnica (1957, 1973, 1982).

In 1988, Plicková was awarded the Gold Medal Ľudovíta Štúra from the Slovak Academy of Sciences (SAS) for her contributions to preserving the folk culture of Slovakia. She retired from the Institute of Ethnology in 1989 and though she had problems with her vision in her retirement, she worked with the Centre for Folk Art Production in their development and continued her research and publishing. In 2005, the SAS recognized her contributions again by honoring her as the Personality of the Year.

Death and legacy
Plicková died on 1 December 2011 in Bratislava, Slovakia. Shortly before her death, a solo exhibition of her photographic works was presented.

References

Citations

Bibliography

1928 births
2011 deaths
Writers from Bratislava
Ethnographers
Slovak academics
Slovak photographers
Slovak women photographers
20th-century Slovak women writers
20th-century Slovak writers
Slovak anthropologists
Slovak women anthropologists